Moraid is a Papuan language of the Bird's Head Peninsula of New Guinea. It is spoken in Moraid District, Tambrauw Regency, West Papua.

References

Languages of western New Guinea

West Bird's Head languages